Diplomatic relations between Albania and North Korea were established on November 28, 1948, over one and a half months after the DPRK was proclaimed. The communist governments of Enver Hoxha and Kim Il-sung were often compared for their similarities in their diplomatic isolation and Stalinist-style regimes.

History

Cold War 
During the Korean War, North Korea and the Korean People's Army were supported diplomatically by Albania. From 29 June to 1 July 1956, First Secretary of the Party of Labour of Albania Enver Hoxha hosted Premier Kim Il-sung in Tirana on a state visit. On 6 June 1959, Hoxha and Prime Minister Mehmet Shehu received President of the Supreme People's Assembly Choe Yong-gon on an official goodwill visit. In 1961, Albania and North Korea signed a joint declaration of friendship.

Sino-Soviet Split and deterioration 
According to Charles Armstrong has said, Albania was a “litmus test” for determining North Korea’s position in the Sino-Soviet split. During the Sino-Soviet split, North Korea took a neutral position while Albania supported the Chinese, contributing to the deterioration of relations. This had an effect on Albanian-Korean contacts, with the Albanian ambassador claiming in October 1961 that Premier Kim during a congress meeting in Moscow "could and should have had more contacts with our delegation" and that "he was afraid of being noticed by the Soviets.” That month, the Albanian embassy to Pyongyang was allowed to spread anti-Soviet pamphlets after prior consultations with the North Korean government. At a WPK general meeting in March 1962, Premier Kim admitted that “we (North Korea) must prepare for the contingency that the Soviet Union will cast us aside in the same way as it happened to Albania.”

In the 1970s, relations between the two nations deteriorated, with Hoxha writing in June 1977 that the Korean Workers' Party had betrayed communism by accepting foreign aid (particularly between the Eastern Bloc and countries such as Yugoslavia). His condemnation of the DPRK contributed to the development of his own ideology of Hoxhaism, which labeled countries like North Korea as "revisionist". He also slammed Kim's cult of personality, which he claimed "has reached a level unheard of anywhere else, either in past or present times, let alone in a country which calls itself socialist." As a result, relations between the two nations would continue to remain frosty until the 1985 death of Hoxha and the subsequent fall of the People's Socialist Republic he created.

Modern era 
Relations were normalized after 1990, however were not as high of a level as they were before. In November 2012, on the occasion of the 100th Anniversary of the Independence of Albania, North Korean President of Parliament Kim Yong-nam sent a congratulatory message to Albanian President Bujar Nishani. Today, North Korea is represented in Albania by its embassy in Sofia, Bulgaria.

References 

North Korea
Bilateral relations of North Korea